"J'avais pas les mots" is a song by French rapper La Fouine and produced by Luca Presti (pka his old alias “So Loud”). It was released on November 19, 2012 as the lead single from his fifth studio album Drôle de parcours. It peaked at number 16 on the French Singles Chart, and at number 39 on the Belgian Ultratop Singles Chart in Wallonia.

Music video
A music video for the song was released on La Fouine's VEVO channel on YouTube on 23 November 2012.

Track listing
 Digital download
 La Fouine - "J'avais pas les mots" – 3:41

Charts

Weekly charts

Year-end charts

References

2012 singles
2012 songs
French hip hop songs
La Fouine songs
Jive Records singles